Myhre syndrome is a rare genetic disorder inherited in an autosomal dominant fashion. It is caused by mutation in SMAD4 gene.

Signs and symptoms
The clinical presentation is variable but includes
 developmental and growth delay
 athletic muscular build
 skeletal anomalies
 joint stiffness
 characteristic facial appearance
 deafness
 variable cognitive deficits
 tracheal stenosis
 aortic stenosis
 pyloric stenosis

The facial abnormalities include:
 blepharophimosis (an abnormally narrow gap between the upper and lower eyelids)
 maxillary hypoplasia (underdevelopment of the upper jaw)
 prognathism (prominent lower jaw)

The skeletal abnormalities include:
 short stature
 square body shape
 broad ribs
 iliac hypoplasia
 brachydactyly
 flattened vertebrae
 thickened calvaria

Congenital heart disease and undescended testes have also been reported in association with this syndrome.

Genetics
Myhre syndrome is due to mutations in the SMAD4 gene. This gene encodes a protein - transducer mediating transforming growth factor beta. Some researchers believe that the SMAD4 gene mutations that cause Myhre syndrome impair the ability of the SMAD4 protein to attach (bind) properly with the other proteins involved in the signaling pathway. Other studies have suggested that these mutations result in an abnormally stable SMAD4 protein that remains active in the cell longer. Changes in SMAD4 binding or availability may result in abnormal signaling in many cell types, which affects development of several body systems and leads to the signs and symptoms of Myhre syndrome.

The patients of this disease exhibit hypertrophic phenotype in their muscle tissues. Myostatin target genes are found to be downregulated while bone morphogenetic protein (BMP) target genes display both upregulated and downregulated genotypes.

Diagnosis

Treatment

History
This disorder was first reported in 1981.
It has many similarities to LAPS Syndrome and they both arise from the same mutations in the SMAD4 gene. It is believed that they are the same syndrome.

References

External links 

Rare genetic syndromes
Rare syndromes
Syndromes affecting the heart
Syndromes with craniofacial abnormalities
Syndromes with dysmelia
Syndromes with short stature
Syndromes with musculoskeletal abnormalities
Syndromes affecting hearing